A Film by Aravind is 2005 Indian Telugu language mystery thriller film written and directed by Sekhar Suri. The film stars Rajeev Kanakala, Rishi, and Sherlyn Chopra in the lead roles. The plot is about a film director and an actor who fall in love with a mysterious woman and a script that dictates the events in their lives. The film was successful at the box office. It was remade in Kannada as Nimma Shankarnag. The film was dubbed into Hindi as Bhayanak: A Murder Mystery in 2011. It was followed by Aravind 2.

Plot 
Childhood friends Aravind (Rajiv Kanakala) and Rishi (Rishi) struggled for film industry fame before Aravind's films with Rishi as hero become successful. They made two blockbuster films together. Then Konda thought of directing a new story written by a new writer and made a job offer to some writers. He then saw a story written by a new writer on which Aravind's co-director unfortunately dropped some ink on the script. Aravind found the script very interesting and he along with Rishi planned to go on a road trip to search for inspiration to complete the remaining script of a third film. During the ride, Aravind and Rishi meet Nirupama (Sherlyn Chopra), whom they save from goons. During the journey, Nirupama asked Rishi to overtake a 'black car' which was in front of them. Rishi then drove the car at a great speed and overtook the car but in the meantime, that 'black car' got hit by a truck but Rishi and his friends had not seen the accident, so they moved forward. Rishi slowly fell in love with Nirupama while they were staying in a cottage. But soon Aravind also found Nirupama very interesting, and he also started loving her. Aravind and Rishi then realise that the events that occurred during their journey was very similar to the script that Aravind had read earlier. The last page that he read from the script prophesied that two friends will fight with each other for a girl and, they had actually fought over Nirupama.

And he called the writer of the script to the woods and asked him to complete the story. The writer said that the girl for whom the two friends were fighting is a psychopath and would kill one of the friends. Aravind believes that they might get killed, so he warns his friend Rishi to leave her and avoid her. But Rishi ignored him and wanted to elope with her and marry her. Aravind hears that a psychopath was moving in the area they live in and this news made him more sure that Nirupama was the psychopath.

Aravind planned to kill Nirupama and save his friend, but then the writer of the script in the story changed the climax of the movie to make the script a romantic story instead of a thriller. As the script changed, the reality also changes with Rishi being safe, but Aravind getting killed by the psychopath (the one on the news).

The reasons that made the psychopath kill Aravind and his friends was that she was in the 'black car' that met with an accident in the race. She felt that Rishi and his friends were responsible for her accident and planned to kill them.

Rishi, after seeing his friend die, fought with the real psychopath and killed her.

Cast 
Rajeev Kanakala as Aravind
Rishi as Rishi
Sherlyn Chopra as Nirupama "Niru"
Ghazal Srinivas as Satyam
Mallikarjuna Rao as Dhaba owner
 Madhu as Housekeeper
 Mansoor Markhand

References

External links 
 

2000s mystery thriller films
2000s Telugu-language films
2005 films
Indian mystery thriller films
Films directed by Sekhar Suri